The Luge World Cup season is a yearly competition first organized by the International Luge Federation since 1977–78. The World Cup is the highest level season-long competition in the sport.

Men's singles 

Medals:

Women's singles 

Medals:

Men's doubles 

Medals:

Women's doubles 

Medals:

Team World Cup 

Medals:

All-time medal count

Multiple winners

Men

Women

See also
 Overall Cup Winners

References
List of men's doubles luge World Cup champions since 1978.
List of men's singles luge World Cup champions since 1978.
List of women's singles luge World Cup champions since 1978.

 
Recurring sporting events established in 1977
Luge competitions
World cups in winter sports